Mix-up is Triple J's long-running Saturday night dance music show, hosted by Sydney DJ Latifa Tee since 2021.

Resident DJs
Since February 2008 the first hour has had a monthly resident DJ, followed by guests performing hour-long mixes.

Previous hosts have included Nicole Foote (?-2010), Nina Las Vegas (2010-2015), Sharif Galal (1995-2005), Andy Garvey (2017-2021) and Chris Fraser (2002-2004).

References

External links 
Mix Up on Triple J's website

Triple J programs